FC Armenicum, is a defunct Armenian football club from Yerevan. It was founded in 2000 and won the Armenian First League during the same year, gaining promotion to the Armenian Premier League for the 2001 season. However, in 2001, Armenicum was absorbed by FC Pyunik who replaced them in the premier league competition automatically. Hence, Armenicum was dissolved in 2001 and retired from professional football.

League Record

References
RSSSF Armenia (and subpages per year)

Armenicum
2001 disestablishments in Armenia